

O

Oberthürite (IMA2017-072) 2.0  [no] [no]
Oberwolfachite (alunite: IMA2021-010)  [no] [no]
Oboyerite (tellurite-tellurium oxysalt: IMA1979-009) 4.JN.25    (IUPAC: hexahydrogen hexalead tritellurate(IV) dihexaoxotellurate(VI) dihydrate)
Obradovicite (heteropolymolybdate, betpakdalite) 7.GB.40
Obradovicite-KCu (IMA2010-E, IMA1978-061) 7.GB.40   
Obradovicite-NaCu (IMA2011-079) 7.GB.40  [no] [no]
Obradovicite-NaNa (IMA2011-046)  7.GB.40  [no] [no] 
O'danielite (alluaudite: IMA1979-040) 8.AC.10    (Na☐ZnZn2[AsO4][AsO3(OH)]2)
Odigitriaite (IMA2015-028) 9.E?.  [no] [no] (IUPAC: caesium pentasodium pentacalcium [diboron octatriacontaoxotetradecasilicate] difluoride)
Odikhinchaite (eudialyte: IMA2020-064) 9.CO.  [no] [no]
Odinite (serpentine: IMA1988-015) 9.ED.05   
Odintsovite (IMA1994-052) 9.CJ.50   [no]
Oenite (loellingite: IMA1995-007) 2.EB.10f   
Offretite (zeolitic tectosilicate: IMA1997 s.p., 1969) 9.GD.25    (IUPAC: potassium calcium magnesium (pentaalumotridecasilicate) hexatriacontaoxy pentadecahydrate)
Oftedalite (milarite: IMA2003-045a) 9.CM.05   
Ogdensburgite (IMA1980-054) 8.DC.57    (IUPAC: dicalcium tetrairon(III) zinc hexahydro tetrarsenate hexahydrate)
Ognitite (IMA2018-006a) 2.0 [no] [no] [no] (IUPAC: nickel bismuth telluride)
Ohmilite (IMA1974-031) 9.DH.10   
Ojuelaite (arthurite: IMA1979-035) 8.DC.15    (IUPAC: zinc diiron(III) dihydro diarsenate tetrahydrate)
Okanoganite-(Y) (okanoganite: IMA1979-048) 9.AJ.35   
Okayamalite (melilite: IMA1997-002) 9.BB.10   [no] (IUPAC: dicalcium diboron heptaoxosilicate)
Okenite (Y: 1828) 9.EA.40    (IUPAC: decacalcium hexatetracontaoxoctadecasilicate octadecahydrate)
Okhotskite (IMA1985-010a) 9.BG.20   
Okieite (decavanadate: IMA2018-080) 4.0  [no] [no]
Okruschite (roscherite: IMA2013-097) 8.0  [no] [no] (IUPAC: dicalcium pentamanganese(II) tetraberyllium tetrahydro hexarsenate hexahydrate)
Oldhamite (galena, rocksalt: 1863) 2.CD.10    (IUPAC: calcium sulfide)
Oldsite (IMA2021-075) 7.EC.  [no] [no]
Olekminskite (IMA1989-047) 5.AB.40    (IUPAC: distrontium dicarbonate)
Olenite (tourmaline: IMA1985-006) 9.CK.05   
Olgite (aphthitalite: IMA1979-027) 8.AC.40   
Olivenite (andalusite: 1820) 8.BB.30    (IUPAC: dicopper hydroxide arsenate)
Olkhonskite (schreyerite: IMA1993-035) 4.CB.35    (IUPAC: dichromium trititanium nonaoxide)
Olmiite (IMA2006-026) 9.AF.90   [no] (IUPAC: calcium manganese [hydrotrioxosilicate] hydroxide)
Olmsteadite (IMA1974-034) 8.DJ.05    (IUPAC: potassium diiron(II) niobium dioxo diphosphate dihydrate)
Olsacherite (baryte: IMA1969-009) 7.AD.35    (IUPAC: dilead (tetraoxoselenate(VI)) sulfate)
Olshanskyite (IMA1968-025) 6.CA.55   
Olympite (IMA1979-065) 8.AA.30    (IUPAC: lithium pentasodium diphosphate)
Omariniite (IMA2016-050) 2.0  [no] [no] (Cu8Fe2ZnGe2S12)
Omeiite (löllingite: IMA1985-xxx, 1978) 2.EB.15a    (IUPAC: osmium diarsenide)
Ominelite (IMA1999-025) 9.AJ.05   [no] (IUPAC: iron(II) trialuminium dioxy trioxoborate tetraoxysilicate)
Omongwaite (IMA2003-054b) 7.CD.65    (IUPAC: disodium pentacalcium hexasulfate trihydrate)
Omphacite (pyroxene: IMA1988 s.p.) 9.DA.20   
Omsite (hydrotalcite: IMA2012-025) 4.FB.  [no]  (IUPAC: dinickel iron(III) hexahydroxide [antimony hexahydroxide])
Ondrušite (lindackerite: IMA2008-010) 8.CE.30  [no] [no] (IUPAC: calcium tetracopper diarsenate di(hydroxoarsenate(V)) decahydrate)
Oneillite (eudialyte: IMA1998-064) 9.CO.10   [no]
Onoratoite (IMA1967-032) 3.DC.80    (IUPAC: octaantimony undecaoxide dichloride)
Oosterboschite (IMA1970-016) 2.BC.10    (IUPAC: hepta(lead,copper) pentaselenide)
Opal (a mineraloid) (Y: old) 4.DA.10   [no]
Ophirite (heteropolytungstate: IMA2013-017) 4.0  [no] [no]
Oppenheimerite (IMA2014-073) 7.0  [no] [no] (IUPAC: disodium uranyl disulfate trihydrate)
Orcelite (metalloid alloy: IMA1962 s.p., 1959) 2.AB.10    ( (x = 0.23))
Ordoñezite (tapiolite: 1955) 4.DB.10    (IUPAC: zinc diantimony(V) hexaoxide)
Örebroite (welinite: IMA1985-039) 9.AF.75    
Oregonite (IMA1962 s.p., 1959) 2.BB.05    (IUPAC: iron dinickel diarsenide)
Oreillyite (nitride: IMA2020-030a) 1.0  [no] [no] (IUPAC: dichromium nitride)
Organovaite (labuntsovite) 9.CE.30g
Organovaite-Mn (IMA2000-031) 9.CE.30g   [no]
Organovaite-Zn (IMA2001-006) 9.CE.30g   [no]
Orickite (IMA1978-059) 2.FB.15    (IUPAC: copper iron disulfide monohydrate)
Orientite (Y: 1921) 9.BJ.05   
Orlandiite (selenite: IMA1998-038, IMA1998-035) 4.JH.20    (IUPAC: trilead tetrachlorine trioxoselenate(IV) monohydrate)
Orlovite (mica: IMA2009-006) 9.EC.20  [no] [no] (IUPAC: potassium dilithium titanium undecaoxytetrasilicate fluoride)
Orlymanite (IMA1988-029) 9.EE.30   
Orpiment (orpiment: 1944) 2.FA.30    (IUPAC: trisulfa diarsenide)
Orschallite (sulfite: IMA1990-041) 4.JE.15    (IUPAC: tricalcium disulfite sulfate dodecahydrate)
Orthobrannerite (IMA1982 s.p., 1978) 4.DH.05    (IUPAC: uranium(IV) uranium(VI) tetratitanium dihydro dodecaoxide)
Orthocuproplatinum (alloy: IMA2018-124) 1.0  [no] [no] (IUPAC: triplatinium copper alloy)
Orthoclase (feldspar: IMA1962 s.p., 1823) 9.FA.30    (IUPAC: potassium (aluminium octaoxotrisilicate)
Orthogersdorffite (gersdorffite-Pca21: 1982) 2.EB.25  [no] [no]
Orthojoaquinite (joaquinite) 9.CE.25
Orthojoaquinite-(Ce) (IMA1979-081b) 9.CE.25   
Orthojoaquinite-(La) (IMA2000-D) 9.CE.25   
Orthominasragrite (minasragrite: IMA2000-018) 7.DB.20    (IUPAC: vanadium(IV) oxosulfate pentahydrate)
Orthopinakiolite (orthopinakiolite: IMA1962 s.p., 1960) 6.AB.40    (IUPAC: dimagnesium manganese(III) dioxo(trioxoborate))
Orthoserpierite (IMA1983-022a) 7.DD.30    (IUPAC: calcium tetracopper hexahydro disulfate trihydrate)
Orthowalpurgite (IMA1994-024) 8.EA.05    (IUPAC: uranyl tetrabismuth tetraoxo diarsenate dihydrate)
Osakaite (ktenasite: IMA2006-049) 7.DE.40    (IUPAC: tetrazinc hexahydro sulfate pentahydrate)
Osarizawaite (alunite, alunite: IMA1987 s.p., 1961 Rd) 7.BC.10    (IUPAC: lead (dialuminium copper(II)) hexahydro disulfate)
Osarsite (arsenopyrite: IMA1971-025) 2.EB.20    (IUPAC: osmium sulfarsenide)
Osbornite (nitride: 1870) 1.BC.15    (IUPAC: titanium nitride)
Oscarkempffite (lillianite: IMA2011-029) 2.0  [no] [no] (Ag10Pb4(Sb17Bi9)S48)
Oskarssonite (perovskite: IMA2012-088) 3.0  [no]  (IUPAC: aluminium trifluoride)
Osmium (element: IMA1991 s.p., 1804 Rd) 1.AF.05   
Osumilite (milarite) 9.CM.05
Osumilite (1953) 9.CM.05    (IUPAC: potassium diiron (pentalumino decasilicate) triacontaoxy)
Osumilite-(Mg) (IMA2011-083) 9.CM.05    (IUPAC: potassium dimagnesium trialuminium (dialuminodecasilicate) triacontaoxy)
Oswaldpeetersite (IMA2000-034) 5.EA.20    (IUPAC: diuranyl dihydro carbonate tetrahydrate)
Otavite (calcite: 1842) 5.AB.05    (IUPAC: cadmium carbonate)
Otjisumeite (IMA1978-080) 9.J0.15    (IUPAC: lead tetragermanium nonaoxide)
Ottemannite (IMA1968 s.p., 1966) 2.DB.10    (IUPAC: ditin trisulfide)
Ottensite (IMA2006-014) 2.MA.05   [no] (IUPAC: trisodium tri(trioxodiantimony) (trisulfa antimonide) trihydrate)
Ottohahnite (IMA2015-098) 7.0  [no] [no] (IUPAC: dodecasodium tetrauranyl decasulfate tetradecawater trihydrate)
Ottoite (lead-tellurium oxysalt: IMA2009-063) 7.0  [no] [no] (IUPAC: dilead tellurium pentaoxide)

Ottrélite (Y: 1842) 9.AF.85    (IUPAC: manganese(II) dialuminium dihydroxide oxide silicate)
Otwayite (IMA1976-028) 5.DA.15    (IUPAC: dinickel dihydroxide carbonate monohydrate)
Oulankaite (IMA1990-055) 2.BC.40    (IUPAC: pentalead tetracopper tin disulfide ditelluride)
Ourayite (lillianite: IMA1976-007) 2.JB.40c    (Ag3Pb4Bi5S13)
Oursinite (IMA1982-051) 9.AK.10    (IUPAC: cobalt diuranyl di(hydrotrioxosilicate) hexahydrate)
Ovamboite (germanite: IMA1992-039) 2.CB.30   [no] (Cu10Fe3WGe3S16)
Overite (overite: 1940) 8.DH.20    (IUPAC: calcium magnesium aluminium hydroxide diphosphate tetrahydrate)
Owensite (IMA1993-061) 2.FC.05   
Owyheeite (Y: 1920) 2.HC.35    (Ag3Pb10Sb11S28)
Oxammite (oxalate: 1870) 10.AB.55    (IUPAC: diammonium oxalate monohydrate)
Oxo-magnesio-hastingsite [Ca-amphibole: IMA2011-035] 9.D?.  [no] [no]
Oxo-mangani-leakeite [Na-amphibole: IMA2015-035] 9.D?.  [no] [no]
Oxybismutomicrolite (pyrochlore: IMA2019-047) 4.0  [no] [no]
Oxycalciopyrochlore (pyrochlore: IMA2010 s.p., IMA1978-052 Rd) 4.0    (IUPAC: dicalcium diniobium hexaoxide oxide)
Oxycalciomicrolite (pyrochlore: IMA2019-110) 4.0  [no] [no]
Oxycalcioroméite (pyrochlore: IMA2012-022) 4.0  [no] [no] (IUPAC: dicalcium diantimony(V) heptaoxide)
Oxy-chromium-dravite (tourmaline: IMA2011-097) 9.CK.  [no] [no]
Oxy-dravite (tourmaline: IMA2012-004a) 9.CK.05  [no] [no]
Oxy-foitite (tourmaline: IMA2016-069) 9.CK.05  [no] [no]
Oxykinoshitalite (mica: IMA2004-013) 9.EC.35   
Oxynatromicrolite (pyrochlore: IMA2013-063) 4.0  [no] [no]
Oxyphlogopite (mica: IMA2009-069) 9.EC.20  [no] [no]
Oxyplumboroméite (pyrochlore: IMA2013-042) 4.0  [no] [no] (IUPAC: dilead diantimony heptaoxide)
Oxy-schorl (tourmaline: IMA2011-011) 9.CK.  [no] [no]
Oxystannomicrolite (pyrochlore: IMA2010 s.p., 1968 Rd) 4.0  (red. )   (IUPAC: ditin ditantalum heptaoxide)
Oxystibiomicrolite (pyrochlore: IMA2010 s.p., 1938 Rd) 4.0  (red. )  
Oxy-vanadium-dravite (tourmaline: IMA2011-E, IMA1999-050 Rd) 9.CK.05   [no]
Oxyvanite (IMA2008-044) 4.CB.30   [no] (IUPAC: divanadium(III) vanadium(IV) pentaoxide)
Oxyyttrobetafite-(Y) (IMA2022-002)
Oyelite (IMA1980-103) 9.HA.80    (IUPAC: decacalcium diboron nonadocosaoxoctasilicate dodecahydrate)
Oyonite (IMA2018-002) 2.0  [no] [no]
Ozernovskite (tellurate: IMA2021-059) 4.JN.  [no] [no]
Ozerovaite (IMA2016-019) 8.  [no] [no] (IUPAC: disodium potassium trialuminium tetrarsenate)

External links
IMA Database of Mineral Properties/ RRUFF Project
Mindat.org - The Mineral Database
Webmineral.com
Mineralatlas.eu minerals O